Florin Lupeică (born 6 March 1973) is a Romanian fencer. He competed in the sabre events at the 1992, 1996 and 2000 Summer Olympics.

References

External links
 

1973 births
Living people
Romanian male sabre fencers
Olympic fencers of Romania
Fencers at the 1992 Summer Olympics
Fencers at the 1996 Summer Olympics
Fencers at the 2000 Summer Olympics
Sportspeople from Iași